Claudio Olinto de Carvalho (1 February 1942 – 3 September 2016), also known as Nené, was a Brazilian professional football coach and a former player, who played as a midfielder.

Honours

Club
Santos
 Campeonato Paulista champion: 1962.
 Taça Brasil champion: 1962, 1963.
 Torneio Rio-São Paulo winner: 1963.
 Copa Libertadores winner: 1962, 1963.
 Intercontinental Cup winner: 1962.

Cagliari
 Serie A champion: 1969–70.

International
Brazil
 Pan American Games champion: 1963.

References

1942 births
2016 deaths
Sportspeople from Santos, São Paulo
Brazilian footballers
Brazilian expatriate footballers
Brazilian expatriate sportspeople in Italy
Expatriate footballers in Italy
Serie A players
Juventus F.C. players
Santos FC players
Cagliari Calcio players
Brazilian football managers
Association football midfielders
Pan American Games medalists in football
Pan American Games gold medalists for Brazil
Footballers at the 1963 Pan American Games
Medalists at the 1963 Pan American Games